In phonetics and historical linguistics, fusion, or coalescence, is a sound change where two or more segments with distinctive features merge into a single segment. This can occur both on consonants and in vowels. A merger between two segments can also occur between word boundaries, an example being the phrase got ya being pronounced like gotcha . Most cases of fusion lead to allophonic variation, though some sequences of segments may lead to wholly distinct phonemes.

A common form of fusion is found in the development of nasal vowels, which frequently become phonemic when final nasal consonants are lost from a language. This occurred in French and Portuguese. Compare the French words un vin blanc  "a white wine" with their English cognates, one, wine, blank, which retain the n's.

Often the resulting sound has the place of articulation of one of the source sounds and the manner of articulation of the other, as in Malay.

Vowel coalescence is extremely common. The resulting vowel is often long, and either between the two original vowels in vowel space, as in  →  →  and  →  →  in French (compare English day  and law ), in Hindi (with ), and in some varieties of Arabic; or combines features of the vowels, as in  →  →  and  →  → .

Compensatory lengthening may be considered an extreme form of fusion.

Examples

Indo-European languages

English
Words ending in the Latin-derived suffixes -tion and -sion, such as fiction and mission, are examples that exhibit yod coalescence.

This sound change was not, however, distributed evenly. Words that did not experience universal yod coalescence, are always realised as two segments in accents like Received Pronunciation. Most other dialects do pronounce them as one segment, however, like American English.

Words with primary stress on a syllable with such a cluster did not experience coalescence either. Examples include tune  and assume . In General American,  elides entirely when following alveolar consonants, in a process called yod dropping. Words that have already coalesced are not affected by this.

Australian English exhibits yod coalescence to an extreme degree, even when the cluster is in a stressed syllable, though there is some sociolectal variation. This can result in homophony between previously distinct words, as between dune and June, which are both pronounced .

Romance languages

Sequences of plosives followed by  most often became affricates, often being intermediary stages to other manners of articulation. Sonorants in such a sequence (except bilabial consonants) mostly became palatalized.

Greek

Although the labiovelars were already a single consonant, they had two places of articulation, a velar articulation and labial secondary articulation. However, the development of labiovelars varies from dialect to dialect, and some may have become dental instead. An example is the word  "cow" from Proto-Greek .

A vowel coalescence from Ancient Greek to Koine Greek fused many diphthongs, especially those including . E.g.  > ;  > ;  and  >  and  > .

Celtic languages
Several consonant clusters in Proto-Celtic underwent fusion, most prominently /*ɡ/ to the following consonant in coda position.

North Germanic languages
In Norwegian and Swedish, this process occurs whenever the phoneme  is followed by an alveolar consonant. The articulation of the resulting fusion becomes retroflex. Examples include the Norwegian   and Swedish  . This even occurs across word boundaries, as in the sentence "går det bra?" becoming .

An extreme example of this would be the word ordensstraff , having six retroflex consonants in a row.

In colloquial Norwegian, the sequence /rt/ may even coalesce over non-alveolar phonemes, changing their place of articulation to retroflex, even if /r/ normally wouldn't trigger it. This process does not occur across word boundaries, e.g. sterk tann is pronounced  and not 

In dialects where  is articulated uvularly, this process invariably takes place on idiolectal level. This may appear in regions where /r/ has recently become uvular.

Austronesian languages

Malay
In Malay, the final consonant of the prefix  (where N stands for a "placeless nasal", i.e. a nasal with no specified place of articulation) coalesces with a voiceless stop at the beginning of the root to which the prefix is attached. The resulting sound is a nasal that has the place of articulation of the root-initial consonant. For example:

Japanese
Vowel coalescence occurs in Owari Japanese. E.g.   > ,   > ,   > . Younger speakers may vary between Standard Japanese diphthongs and dialectal monophthongs.

See also
 Sandhi, sound changes that occur at morpheme or word boundaries
 Unpacking, the opposite of fusion
 Yod-coalescence

References

Sources
Crowley, Terry. (1997) An Introduction to Historical Linguistics. 3rd edition. Oxford University Press.

Assimilation (linguistics)